Tim Harcourt is an Australian economist who is the J.W. Nevile Fellow in economics at the UNSW Business School, and an advisor to the Government of South Australia on international engagement.

Harcourt was awarded a Bachelor of Economics (Honours) from the University of Adelaide, and a Master of Arts in Economics from the University of Minnesota, and also completed the Trade Union Program at Harvard Law School. He was the Chief Economist of Austrade (the Australian Trade Commission) until 2011, and earlier worked for the Australian Council of Trade Unions, the Australian Industrial Relations Commission and the Reserve Bank of Australia.

Harcourt teaches International Business at the UNSW Business School, in the AGSM MBA programme in Asia and Latin America with a focus on China, India, ASEAN, Brazil, Chile, Colombia and other emerging markets. Tim is a Visiting Professor at the Pontificia Universidad Catolica (PUC) in Chile. He also writes for a number of major publications including The Australian Financial Review, The Sydney Morning Herald, The Age, Business Review Weekly, The Australian, The Advertiser, The Herald Sun, The West Australian, The Courier Mail, The OECD Observer, The Globalist, The National Times, The Drum, The Conversation, The Economic Times and various websites and blogs.

He is married and has a daughter adopted from the People's Republic of China and a son from Taiwan. He is the son of Geoff Harcourt, an academic economist, and Joan Harcourt.

Books
The Airport Economist (2008). Allen & Unwin, 
Going the Distance: Essays on Australia and the Global Economy: 2004-2008 (2008). Australian Trade Commission
Beyond Our Shores: Essays on Australia and the Global Economy (2005). Australian Trade Commission, 

Trading Places - The Airport Economist's guide to International Business UNSW Press 2014

References

External links
Official website
UNSW profile
The Airport Economist - Tim Harcourt's blog hosted by UNSW

Living people
Year of birth missing (living people)
Australian economists
University of Adelaide alumni
University of Minnesota College of Liberal Arts alumni
Academic staff of the University of New South Wales